Les Watkins (23 May 1914 – 5 July 1974) was an Australian rules footballer who played with Carlton in the Victorian Football League (VFL).

Notes

External links 

Les Watkins's profile at Blueseum

1914 births
1974 deaths
Carlton Football Club players
Australian rules footballers from Victoria (Australia)